1996 Empress's Cup Final was the 18th final of the Empress's Cup competition. The final was played at National Stadium in Tokyo on January 19, 1997. Nikko Securities Dream Ladies won the championship.

Overview
Nikko Securities Dream Ladies won their 3rd title, by defeating Yomiuri-Seiyu Beleza 3–0.

Match details

See also
1996 Empress's Cup

References

Empress's Cup
Empress's Cup Final
Empress's Cup Final